Auton (Guardian ad litem of) v British Columbia (AG), [2004] 3 S.C.R. 657,  is a leading decision of the Supreme Court of Canada wherein the Court ruled that government funding for non-core medically necessary treatments is not protected under section 15(1) of the Canadian Charter of Rights and Freedoms.

Background
The parents of several children with autism brought an action against the British Columbia government for failing to fund Applied Behavioral Analysis (ABA/IBI), a form of therapy for children with autism.

Both at trial and in the British Columbia Court of Appeal the Court found that the children's equality rights (under section 15) were violated.

Ruling 
The Court unanimously decided that the refusal to fund the ABA/IBI treatment did not violate the children's section 15 equality rights.

McLachlin, writing for the Court, reiterated that the question here is whether the petitioners were denied a benefit in a discriminatory manner (see Law test). However, here, she claimed, the benefit of "funding for all medically required treatment" is not guaranteed by law, as it is neither promised in the Canada Health Act nor any provincial health legislation. Rather, the Health Act only guarantees funding for core services of which ABA/IBI for autism is not one.

The Court further rejected the possibility that autistics were adversely discriminated against by the underinclusiveness of the legislation. Non-core medical services, McLachlin stated, are by their very nature underinclusive and cannot be considered discriminatory.

For a claim to succeed the petitioner must establish a comparator group from which differential treatment must be shown. In this case, the Court identified the comparator group as a person who is not suffering from a mental disability who wants funding for an emergent or experimental treatment. As the petitioners were unable to show that other seekers of experimental treatments are guaranteed funding, the Court rejected the claim on this basis as well.

External links
 
LEAF (intervener) Factum

Supreme Court of Canada cases
Section Fifteen Charter case law
2004 in Canadian case law
Disability case law